Winchester Castle is a medieval building in Winchester, Hampshire, England. It was founded in 1067.  Only the Great Hall still stands; it houses a museum of the history of Winchester.

History

Early history
On top of this they built a fort to protect the city of Venta Belgarum. This site was chosen by William the Conqueror as the site of one of the first Norman castles in England.

The castle was built in 1067 and for over one hundred years it was the seat of Government of the Norman Kings. Henry II built a stone keep to house the royal treasury and the Domesday Book. A round tower from the original castle complete with sally ports is still visible. In 1141, during The Anarchy, forces of the Empress Matilda were besieged by the forces of King Stephen at the castle, in the Rout of Winchester.

Building the Great Hall
The Great Hall was built of flint with stone dressings; originally it had lower walls and a roof with dormer windows. In their place were added the tall two-light windows with early plate tracery. Extensions to the castle were added by Edward II. The Great Hall is a Grade I listed building. Behind the Great Hall a medieval-style garden, called Queen Eleanor's Garden, was created in 1986.

An Arthurian Round Table was hung in the Great Hall. The table was originally constructed in the 13th century, and repainted in its present form for Henry VIII; around the edge of the table were painted the names of King Arthur's knights. The portrait of King Arthur is recognisably a depiction of the young Henry VIII. A series of pictorial epigrams illuminated in medieval monastic style known as the Winchester Panels were also hung in the Great Hall. They are thought to depict the 25 knights of the Round Table and illustrate the challenges facing a maturing character as it progresses round the great "Wheel of Life".

Later history
In 1302, Edward I and his second wife, Margaret of France, narrowly escaped death when the royal apartments of the castle were destroyed by fire. On 19 March 1330, Edmund of Woodstock, 1st Earl of Kent was beheaded outside the castle walls in the Despenser plot against King Edward III. The castle remained an important residence and on 10 April 1472 Margaret of York, daughter of King Edward IV, was born there.

In 1580 the nun Elizabeth Sander was imprisoned here with other Catholics. She escaped but returned to show that Catholics were law abiding. After Elizabeth I came to the throne in 1558, the castle ceased to be a royal residence and was handed over to Winchester's city authorities.

On 17 November 1603 Sir Walter Raleigh went on trial for treason for his supposed part in the Main Plot in the converted Great Hall. The castle was used by the Royalists in the English Civil War, eventually falling to Parliamentarians in 1646, and then being demolished on Oliver Cromwell's orders in 1649. Later in the 17th century, Charles II planned to build the King's House adjoining the site, commissioning Christopher Wren to design a royal palace to rival the Palace of Versailles, but the project was abandoned by James II. It was in The Great Hall that, in the aftermath of the Monmouth Rebellion, Judge Jeffreys held the Bloody Assizes on 27 August 1685: the accused at the Winchester assizes included Alice Lisle who was condemned to death for harbouring fugitives.

Castle Hill, located nearby, is the location of the Council Chamber for Hampshire County Council and, since 2014, of the Winchester Register Office. The Great Hall was also the home of the Winchester Assizes and, in 1954, another notorious trial took place there, when Edward Montagu, Michael Pitt-Rivers and Peter Wildeblood went on trial and were convicted of charges of having committed specific acts of homosexual indecency. The Great Hall was also the venue of the trial and conviction of six members of the Provisional IRA, in 1973, for the Old Bailey bombing. The Great Hall ceased to be the venue for criminal trials after the Winchester Law Courts were erected, just to the east of the Great Hall, in 1974.

Winchester Castle is located in close proximity as well to the Westgate, part of the remaining city wall.

Gallery

See also
Castles in Great Britain and Ireland
List of castles in England
Three Castles Path

References

Sources

External links

The Great Hall and Round Table - official site

Castles in Hampshire
Castle
Tourist attractions in Hampshire
1067 establishments in England
Grade I listed buildings in Hampshire
Museums in Winchester
Castle
Former courthouses in England